Gmina Mniszków is a rural gmina (administrative district) in Opoczno County, Łódź Voivodeship, in central Poland.

The gmina contains part of the protected area called Sulejów Landscape Park.

Villages
Gmina Mniszków contains the villages and settlements of Błogie Rządowe, Błogie Szlacheckie, Bukowiec nad Pilicą, Duży Potok, Góry Trzebiatowskie, Grabowa, Jawor, Jawor-Kolonia, Julianów, Konstantynów, Małe Końskie, Marianka, Mniszków, Nowe Błogie, Olimpiów, Owczary, Prucheńsko Duże, Prucheńsko Małe, Radonia, Stoczki, Stok, Strzelce, Świeciechów, Syski, Zajączków and Zarzęcin.

Neighbouring gminas
Gmina Mniszków is bordered by the gminas of Aleksandrów, Paradyż, Sławno, Sulejów, Tomaszów Mazowiecki and Wolbórz.

References
Polish official population figures 2006

Mniszkow
Opoczno County